Bradbury railway station served the village of Bradbury, County Durham, England from 1844 to 1950 on the East Coast Main Line.

History 
The station opened on 19 June 1844 by the North Eastern Railway. It closed to both passengers and goods traffic on 2 January 1950.

References

External links 

Disused railway stations in County Durham
Former North Eastern Railway (UK) stations
Railway stations in Great Britain opened in 1844
Railway stations in Great Britain closed in 1950
1844 establishments in England
1950 disestablishments in England